Kammeyer is a German surname. Notable people with the surname include:

Annkathrin Kammeyer (born 1990), German politician
Bob Kammeyer (1950–2003), American baseball player

See also
Kammerer

German-language surnames